Pa Pa Wadi See Yin Khan is a 2019 Burmese drama film, directed by Wyne starring Moe Hay Ko, Phway Phway, Htun Htun and A Linn Yaung. The film, produced by Mee Mee Shwe Chuu Film Production premiered in Myanmar on October 10, 2019.

Cast
Moe Hay Ko as Nan Shwe Hmone
Phway Phway as Thet Htar Khin
Htun Htun as Thiha Ye Yint
A Linn Yaung as Phone Myat Thway

References

2019 films
2010s Burmese-language films
Burmese drama films
Films shot in Myanmar
Films directed by Wyne
2019 drama films